The Weasel Grave (Chinese: 鬼吹灯之黄皮子坟) is a 2017 Chinese web series adapted from the second book of the novel series Ghost Blows Out the Light directed by acclaimed director Guan Hu. It stars Ethan Juan, Xu Lu, Hao Hao and Liu Chao. The timeline of story marked it as a prequel to the other adaptations.

The series airs Fridays at 20:00 (CST) on Tencent Video starting 21 July 2017.

Synopsis
In the 1980s, when middle-aged Hu Bayi packs his belongings for one of his adventures, he finds an old photo, which brings his memory back to his college days in the 1960s. He then reminiscences about his first adventure that led him to become a tomb-expert.

Cast
 Ethan Juan as Hu Bayi
 Xu Lu as Hua Mei 
 Hao Hao as Ding Sitian
 Ryan Liu Chao as Wang Kaixuan
 Li Yujie as Yan Zi
 Zhang Jinan as White Dog

Production
 The series is Ethan Juan's return to small screen after 8 years. 
 Ethan Juan and Xu Lu previously worked together on the variety show Date ! Super Star (約吧！大明星) in the same year.
 Filming began early October and finished in mid December 2016.
 The first trailer and poster were released on July 4, 2017.
 The series has surpassed 1 billion views in just 2 weeks of airing. In 5 weeks, it has surpassed 2 billion views.

References

External links
 

2017 Chinese television series debuts
Ghost Blows Out the Light
Chinese web series
Tencent original programming
Television series by Tencent Penguin Pictures
2017 web series debuts
Television series by Youhug Media